Afritrophon is a genus of sea snails, marine gastropod mollusks in the family Muricidae, the murex snails or rock snails.

Species
Species within the genus Afritrophon include:

 Afritrophon agulhasensis (Thiele, 1925)
 Afritrophon inglorius Houart, 1987
 Afritrophon insignis (Sowerby, 1900)
 Afritrophon kowieensis (Sowerby, 1901)

References